Hurricane Lili was a moderate tropical cyclone of the 1990 Atlantic hurricane season. It began as a subtropical cyclone over the central Atlantic and became a hurricane while moving westward toward the United States. Lili did not gain any additional strength before curving away from land and weakening into a tropical storm. After transitioning into an extratropical cyclone, it made landfall in southeastern Newfoundland. Overall, the hurricane's effects on land were minimal, despite multiple tropical cyclone watches and warnings. Initial uncertainty in its track prompted some concern of a landfall in North Carolina, but it remained predominantly over the open ocean.

Meteorological history

In early October 1990, a non-tropical low-pressure system existed in the upper levels of the atmosphere southwest of the Azores. By October 6, the low moved to the surface, and upon doing so it immediately became a subtropical cyclone. The system slowly moved toward the southwest for several days, gradually gaining the characteristics of a tropical cyclone; subsequent to turning westward and accelerating in forward speed, it became a hurricane at 0000 UTC on October 11. Steered by a ridge to the north, Hurricane Lili continued on its westward track. It never intensified significantly, and reached its peak intensity with windspeeds of 75 mph (120 km/h) and a minimum air pressure of 987 mbar (hPa; 29.15 inHg) concurrently with its upgrade into a hurricane. Afterward, its air pressure began to slowly rise.

It weakened into a tropical storm on October 13. For a time, the system's proximity to Tropical Storm Marco resulted in hints of the Fujiwhara effect, in which two tropical cyclone appear to rotate around each other. A high-pressure area over Newfoundland steered Lili northeastward, away from the United States, and the tropical storm once again sped up. It skirted the coast of Nova Scotia and transitioned into an extratropical cyclone on October 15, dissipating shortly after crossing southeastern Newfoundland.

Preparations and impact
On October 11, a hurricane warning was issued for Bermuda, although it was replaced by a tropical storm warning later that day. However, the storm's effects on the island were limited to rainfall and gusty winds. It also caused strong winds in Nova Scotia and Newfoundland.

The hurricane's track was initially uncertain. Some forecasts indicated it would continue westward and make landfall on North Carolina, while others predicted it would miss land. A "general evacuation" was ordered on Ocracoke Island, while multiple tropical cyclone watches and warnings were posted along the coasts of North Carolina and Virginia. Some residents purchased emergency supplies to prepare for the hurricane. Lili had minimal impact on land, with no deaths or significant damage reported. The North Carolina coast sustained minor beach erosion. A newspaper reported that rainfall from the storm led to flooding in southern Pennsylvania, particularly in and around Arendtsville. At least one family was forced to leave their home, and a state highway was temporarily closed. The National Hurricane Center's preliminary report on Hurricane Lili does not confirm the two events were related, however.

See also

Other storms of the same name
1901 Louisiana hurricane – another hurricane which formed in the central Atlantic and took an unusual southwestward track
List of Canada hurricanes
List of North Carolina hurricanes (1980–1999)

References

Lili
Lili (1990)
Lili (1990)
Lili (1990)